is a railway station in Ichihara, Chiba, Japan, operated by the East Japan Railway Company (JR East) and the private railway operator Kominato Railway.

Lines
Goi station is served by the Uchibo Line and the Kominato Line.

Station layout

The station has a different address for each company. The address for JR East is 2-1-11 Goi-Chūō-Nishi, Ichihara, Chiba, and the address for the Kominato Railway is 1-1-2 Goi-Chūō-Higashi, Ichihara, Chiba. The station has four tracks with two island platforms, one for the Uchibō line and another for the Kominato line.

Platforms

History
The JNR station opened on March 28, 1912. The Kominato Railway station opened on March 7, 1925.

Passenger statistics
In fiscal 2005, the JR East station was used by an average of 20,307 passengers daily (boarding passengers only), and the Kominato Railway station was used by 1,810 passengers daily.

Surrounding area
 Ichihara City Hall Goi Branch
 Sunplaza Ichihara
 Ichihara Seaside Stadium
 Goi Train Facility
 Chiba Prefectural Keiyō High School
 Tōkai University Bōyō High School
 Kantō Anzen Eisei Gijutsu Center
 Ichihara Sea Fishing Facility

See also
 List of railway stations in Japan

References

External links

 JR East Station information 

Railway stations in Japan opened in 1912
Uchibō Line
Stations of East Japan Railway Company
Railway stations in Chiba Prefecture